Quercus grisea, commonly known as the gray oak, shin oak or scrub oak, is a North American species deciduous or evergreen shrub or medium-sized tree in the white oak group. It is native to the mountains of the southwestern United States and northern Mexico. It hybridises with four other oak species where the ranges overlap, the Arizona white oak (Q. arizonica), the Gambel oak (Q. gambelii), the Mohr oak (Q. mohriana) and the sandpaper oak (Q. pungens).

Description
The twigs are stout and a light reddish-brown, covered with grayish down. The leaves are alternate, leathery, long ovate, entire or with a few coarse teeth. They are grayish-green above and felted beneath and may fall in times of winter drought. The male catkins are yellowish-green and the female flowers are in small spikes growing in the leaf axils and appear in spring at the same time as the new leaves. The acorn cups are scaly, covered with fine hairs, and half as long as the acorns which grow singly or in pairs and are light brown.

Distribution and habitat 
The gray oak grows in the mountains of the southwestern United States (western Texas, New Mexico, Arizona, Colorado, and the Oklahoma Panhandle) and northern Mexico (Sonora, Sinaloa, Chihuahua, Durango, Coahuila, San Luis Potosí, Zacatecas, Hidalgo). Through generally scarce, it is common in the Trans-Pecos region of Texas.

It flourishes in semi-arid conditions characterized by mild winters, dry springs and hot summers. It can spread asexually through the sprouting of root suckers and may form thickets. It grows in association with other oaks, species of juniper, Mexican pinyon (Pinus cembroides), pinyon pine (Pinus edulis), fendlerbush (Fendlera rupicola), bushy sage (Salvia lycioides), Texas madrone (Arbutus xalapensis ), Fremont barberry (Mahonia fremontii), Louisiana sagewort (Artemisia ludoviciana) and soaptree yucca (Yucca elata).

References

External links
 Tropicos.org: Photo of herbarium specimen collected in 1846

grisea
Trees of Northeastern Mexico
Trees of Northwestern Mexico
Trees of the South-Central United States
Trees of the Southwestern United States
Plants described in 1854
Flora of the Sierra Madre Occidental
Oaks of Mexico